Free Willy is a 1993 American family drama film.

Free Willy or Free Willie may also refer to:
 Free Willy (franchise)
 Free Willy 2: The Adventure Home, the 1995 sequel to the 1993 film
 Free Willy 3: The Rescue, the 1997 sequel to the 1995 film
 Free Willy: Escape from Pirate's Cove, the 2010 sequel to the 1997 film
 Free Willy (TV series), an animated series based on the 1993 film
 "Free Willie", an episode of Due South TV series